Archie's TV Funnies is a Saturday morning cartoon animated series produced by Filmation which appeared on CBS from September 11, 1971, to September 1, 1973. The series starred Bob Montana's Archie characters, including Archie Andrews, Betty Cooper, Veronica Lodge, Reggie Mantle and Jughead Jones.

Archie's TV Funnies is the fourth incarnation of the Archie cartoon shows, which began in 1968 as The Archie Show and was then retitled The Archie Comedy Hour in 1969 and Archie's Funhouse in 1970.

This was the first show in the popular series to move away from the series' earlier successful formula of comedic segments and musical segments performed by The Archies musical group. Archie's TV Funnies would each week feature Archie Andrews and his friends running a local television station (which bore a close resemblance to the Filmation studios) which would feature short animated adaptations of several classic newspaper comic strips. A typical episode would start with one of the gang reporting on a story that was occurring in Riverdale that day, then several of the animated strips would be shown to the viewing audience as the reporter continued to report the story, and the episode would then conclude with the entire gang appearing at the end of the story. Although the series ran on CBS for two years, it was replaced in 1973 with Everything's Archie which returned the series to its more familiar format.

Comic strips featured 
As introduced in the opening sequence, the featured strips are:

 Dick Tracy
 The Captain and the Kids
 Emmy Lou
 Nancy
 The Dropouts
 Moon Mullins
 Smokey Stover
 Broom-Hilda

Some of the above featured comic strips were later adapted again as part of Fabulous Funnies, another Filmation production.

Voice cast
 Dallas McKennon - Archie Andrews, Hot Dog, Mr. Weatherbee, Pop Tate, Mr. Lodge, Sam Catchem, Pat Patton, B.O. Plenty, Flattop, Mumbles, President Pearshape,  Hans, der Captain, Alf, Kayo, Earl, Chief Cash U. Nutt, Irwin Troll, Pruneface, additional voices
 Howard Morris- Jughead Jones, Moose Mason, Dilton Doiley, Junior Tracy, B-B Eyes, Fritz, der Inspector, Sluggo Smith, Sandy, Moon Mullins, Professor Transo, additional voices
 John Erwin - Reggie Mantle, Dick Tracy, Alvin, Smokey Stover, Spooky, Gaylord Buzzard, additional voices
 Jane Webb - Betty Cooper, Veronica Lodge, Miss Grundy, Big Ethel, Tess Trueheart, Moon Maid, Gravel Gertie, Mama, Emmy Lou, Taffy, Nancy Ritz, Fritzi Ritz, Cookie, Hazel Nutt, Broom-Hilda, Breathless Mahoney, additional voices

Episodes

References

External links 
 
 

1971 American television series debuts
1973 American television series endings
1970s American animated television series
1970s American sitcoms
American animated sitcoms
American animated television spin-offs
American children's animated comedy television series
CBS original programming
Dick Tracy
English-language television shows
Television shows based on Archie Comics
Television shows based on comic strips
Television series about television
Television series by Filmation
Television series by Universal Television
Crossover animated television series
The Katzenjammer Kids
Television shows directed by Hal Sutherland